Red Hot TV can refer to:

 Red Hot TV (Canada) 
 Red Hot TV (UK)